Tolumnia (abbreviated Tolu.), is a genus in the family Orchidaceae. Previously known as the "equitant oncidiums," the species were segregated from the mega-genus Oncidium by Guido Braem in 1986.  Dancing-lady orchid is a common name for some species in this genus.

Description 
The plants are small, usually epiphytic, with small or absent pseudobulbs completely covered by leaves, which are triangular or circular in cross section and overlap each other at base to resemble a fan. The  inflorescences arise between the leaf base and bear colorful, showy flowers. The labella are large, ornamented by variously shaped calli. The column bears prominent wings flanking the stigma. 
The genus is primarily native to the Greater Antilles, with a few species extending into Florida, the Lesser Antilles, Mexico, Central America and northern South America (from Colombia to French Guiana).

Species 

 Tolumnia arizajuliana  (Withner & J.Jiménez Alm.) Ackerman, 1997 
 Tolumnia bahamensis  (Nash) Braem, 1986 
 Tolumnia calochila  (Cogn.) Braem, 1986 
 Tolumnia compressicaulis (Withner) Braem, 1986 
 Tolumnia gauntlettii (Withner & Jesup) Nir, 1994 
 Tolumnia guianensis (Aubl.) Braem, 1986 
 Tolumnia guibertiana (A.Rich.) Braem, 1986 
 Tolumnia gundlachii (C.Wright ex Griseb.) N.H.Williams & Ackerman, 2007 
 Tolumnia guttata (L.) Nir, 1994 
 Tolumnia haitiensis (Leonard & Ames) Braem, 1986 
 Tolumnia hawkesiana (Moir) Braem, 1986
 Tolumnia henekenii (Schomburgk ex Lindl.) Nir, 1994  
 Tolumnia leiboldi (Rchb. f.) Braem, 1986 
 Tolumnia lucayana (Nash) Braem, 1986 
 Tolumnia pulchella (Hook.) Rafinesque, 1837 
 Tolumnia quadriloba (Schweinf.) Braem, 1986 
 Tolumnia scandens (Moir) Braem, 1986 
 Tolumnia sylvestris (Lindl.) Braem, 1986 
 Tolumnia triquetra (Sw.) Nir, 1994 
 Tolumnia tuerckheimii (Cogn.) Braem, 1986 
 Tolumnia urophylla (Loddiges ex Lindl.) Braem, 1986 
 Tolumnia usneoides (Lindl.) Braem, 1986 
 Tolumnia variegata (Sw.) Braem, 1986 
 Tolumnia velutina (Lindl. & Paxton) Braem, 1986

Synonyms 

 Tolumnia acunae (M. A. Diaz) Nir, 2000 (synonym of: Tolumnia tuerckheimii (Cogn.) Braem, 198)
 Tolumnia borinquensis Sauleda & Ragan, 1996 (synonym of: Tolumnia variegata (Sw.) Braem, 1986)
 Tolumnia caymanensis (Moir) Braem, 1986 (synonym of: Tolumnia leiboldii (Rchb.f.) Braem, 1986)
 Tolumnia lemoniana ssp. lemoniana Braem, 1986 (synonym of: Tolumnia guianensis (Aubl.) Braem, 1986)
 Tolumnia tetrapetala (Jacq.) Braem, 1986 (synonym of Tolumnia guttata (L.) Nir, 1994 )

Hybrids 
 This list is incomplete.
Hybrids of Tolumnia with orchids in other genera are placed in the following nothogenera:
 Aspaleomnia (Alm.) = Tolumnia × Aspasia × Leochilus
 Bramiltumnia (Bmt.) = Tolumnia × Brassia × Miltonia
 Cochlumnia (Ccl.) = Tolumnia × Cochlioda
 Comparumnia (Cmr.) = Tolumnia × Comparettia
 Cuitlumnia (Ctn.) = Tolumnia × Cuitlauzina
 Golumnia (Glm.) = Tolumnia × Gomesa
 Tolucentrum (Tun.) = Tolumnia × Trichocentrum
 Toluglossum (Tgl.) = Tolumnia × Odontoglossum
 Tolumnopsis (Tmp.) = Tolumnia × Miltoniopsis
 Tolutonia (Tut.) =  Tolumnia × Miltonia

References 

 Nir, M. Orchidaceae Antillanae, 94–97, 2000.
Royal Botanic Gardens, Kew : World Checklist of Monocotyledons

External links 

 
Oncidiinae genera
Flora of the Caribbean
Epiphytic orchids
Taxa named by Constantine Samuel Rafinesque